Sasuli may refer to:
 Sasuli, Dust Mohammad
 Sasuli, Jahanabad